Guernewood Park  is an unincorporated community in western Sonoma County, California, on the Russian River,  west of Santa Rosa, and  west of Guerneville, just off State Route 116. Armstrong Redwoods State Reserve and Austin Creek State Recreation Area are to the north.

History
In 1867, George E. Guerne, a young Swiss immigrant arrived in Stumptown. He purchased land and established a subdivision which became Guernewood Park. He constructed and operated a saw mill in Stumptown (later renamed Guerneville).

After the introduction of the railroad into the Russian River valley in the late 1800s, thousands of San Franciscans flocked to the region each summer. Soon, many of the famous big bands started to provide dance music at packed outdoor venues along the river even into the 1950s. Woody Herman, Tommy Dorsey and other famous names were frequent performers during the Big Band era. Hollywood stars were also frequent visitors.

Content references

Unincorporated Areas in California
RRROC Draft Design Guidelines
History of Armstrong Redwoods SR
History of Russian River Recreation Area
Russian River/West County Map

External links
Armstrong Redwoods SR
Austin Creek SRA
Russian River Chamber of Commerce & Visitor Center
Russian River Redevelopment Oversight Committee (RRROC)
Russian River Historical Society
Historic Maps of Guernewood Park
Topographic map from TopoQuest

Area business
Fern Grove 

Unincorporated communities in California
Unincorporated communities in Sonoma County, California